Abrams' law (also called Abrams' water-cement ratio law) is a concept in civil engineering. The law states the strength of a concrete mix is inversely related to the mass ratio of water to cement. As the water content increases, the strength of concrete decreases.

Abrams’ law is a special case of a general rule formulated empirically by Feret:

where

S is the strength of concrete
A and B are constants and A=96 N/mm2, B=7 (this is valid for the strength of concrete at the age of 28 days) 
w/c is the water–cement ratio, which varies from 0.3 to 1.20

References 

Civil engineering